Keith Douglas Scott (born July 20, 1954) is a Canadian guitarist. He is best known for his collaboration with Bryan Adams, for whom he plays lead guitar, since 1976. He has also worked with notable singers including Cher, Tina Turner, David Bowie, Bryan Ferry, Tom Cochrane, Craig Northey, João Pedro Pais, Jann Arden.

Biography

Early life
Scott was born in Vancouver, British Columbia. His father played jazz piano and his mother sang occasionally. At age 14, he learned how to play the acoustic guitar and, by the time he was 17, he had acquired a used 1960s Fender Stratocaster, which was to become a regular instrument. Many of his musical influences, including Jimi Hendrix, Eric Clapton and Jeff Beck, were also associated with this instrument.

Scott formed a band with people he had met at school but quickly found work with better-known bands such as  "Bowser Moon", The Handley Page Group and Zingo, playing about 300 shows a year in the then lucrative nightclub scene.

Work with Bryan Adams
Scott was introduced to Adams in Ontario in the summer of 1976. In the late 1970s, he started doing some recording work for the then-unknown Adams. This proved successful and within a year, Scott was touring with Adams. They have been together on stage ever since.

In a Twitter post in May 2016, Bryan Adams described Scott as "the most underrated guitarist ever".

Musical style and influence
Writing for Premier Guitar, Nashville bassist and producer Victor Brodén wrote:

"Keith Scott [...] is an endless source of inspiration for me. His solos are immediate. And anyone is able to sing them after just one or two listens. He plays the most simple, hooky, major-scale melodies, mixes them with a little blues to make them slightly dirty, and then finishes it all off with a right-hand attack and intent that floors me. I try to craft my bass lines like Keith crafts guitar solos."

Instruments and equipment
Gretsch produced a "Keith Scott Nashville Gold Top" signature guitar, to Scott's specifications.

Keith mainly uses a Fender Stratocaster when on tour with Bryan Adams though he does change guitars throughout the set. In the early to mid-'80s, he used a Gibson Les Paul more and towards the end of the '80s he used a Telecaster on tour. 

Keith uses a variety of Boss Pedals as well as an Ibanez Tube Screamer.

Personal life
Scott resides in San Diego, California. He is married and has 2 children.

References

External links

1954 births
Canadian male guitarists
Canadian rock guitarists
Lead guitarists
Living people